The 2016 Western Illinois Leathernecks football team represented Western Illinois University as member of the Missouri Valley Football Conference (MVFC) during the 2016 NCAA Division I FCS football season. Led by first-year head coach Charlie Fisher, the Leathernecks compiled an overall record of 6–5 with a mark of 3–5 in conference play, tying for sixth place in the MVFC. Western Illinois played home games at Hanson Field in Macomb, Illinois.

Schedule

Game summaries

at Eastern Illinois

Northern Arizona

at Northern Illinois

Western Illinois beat Northern Illinois, 28–23.  The Leathernecks were leading 28–7 in the third quarter and held on for the win.  WIU quarterback Sean McGuire went 21 for 37 for 315 yards.  Wide receiver Joey Borsellino had nine catches for 148 yards.  This was Western's first-ever victory over an FBS team.

at South Dakota State

Indiana State

at Missouri State

North Dakota State

at South Dakota

Illinois State

Northern Iowa

at Southern Illinois

Ranking movements

References

Western Illinois
Western Illinois Leathernecks football seasons
Western Illinois Leathernecks football